Turan is a given name and a surname. It may refer to:

Given name
 Turan (mythology), in Etruscan mythology, the goddess of love and vitality and patroness of Vulci
 Turan-Shah (died 1180), Ayyubid prince (emir) of Yemen, Baalbek, Damascus, Alexandria
 Turan Akalın (born 1984), Turkish wheelchair tennis player and wheelchair curler
 Turan Dursun (1934–1990), Turkish mufti
 Turan Güneş (politician) (1922–1982), Turkish politician
 Turan Mirzayev (born 1979), Azerbaijani weightlifter
 Turan Sofuoğlu (born 1965), Turkish footballer

Surname
 Ali Turan (born 1983), Turkish soccer player
 Arda Turan (born 1987), Turkish footballer
 Atila Turan (born 1992), Turkish-French footballer
 Cemil Turan (born 1947), Turkish footballer
 Ekin Tunçay Turan, Turkish stage actress and translator
 Emre Turan (born 1990), Turkish soccer player
 Esin Turan (born 1970), Austrian-Turkish painter and sculptor
 Fatih Turan (born 1993), Turkish footballer
 Frigyes Turán (born 1974), Hungarian rally driver
 Hakan Turan (born 1992), Turkish soccer player
 İlter Turan, Turkish academic
 Kenneth Turan (born 1946), American film critic
 Mehmet Cahit Turan (born 1960), Turkish civil engineer, civil servant and former government minister
 Murat Turan (born 1975), Turkish para archer
 Nesim Turan (born 1992), Turkish Paralympic table tennis player
 Özdemir Turan (born 1950), Turkish acrobat
 Pál Turán (1910–1976), Hungarian mathematician
 Sali Turan (born 1949), Turkish painter
 Sefer Turan (born 1962), Turkish journalist
 Veysel Turan (1901-2007), Turkish veteran of the Turkish War of Independence

See also
Turan (disambiguation)
 Turan-Mirza Kamal (1951–2004), American musician

Turkish-language surnames
Turkish masculine given names